Cleveland Police is the territorial police force responsible for the policing area corresponding to the former county of Cleveland in Northern England. As of September 2017, the force had 1,274 police officers, 278 police staff, 124 police community support officers and 64 special constables. In the 2019 annual assessment by His Majesty's Inspectorate of Constabulary, Cleveland Police was rated 'inadequate' overall and rated 'inadequate' in all review areas. 

In terms of officer numbers, Cleveland Police is the 12th smallest of the 48 police forces of the United Kingdom. Cleveland has the fourth smallest population of any force in England and Wales, but in terms of officers per 100,000 of population it is the fifth largest.

Geographically, the force has the second smallest police area of the 43 territorial police forces of England and Wales, after the City of London Police.  The force is responsible for policing a predominantly urban, densely populated area, closely resembling metropolitan authorities in socio-economic characteristics and policing needs.

Since 2010 Cleveland Police and neighbouring Durham Constabulary have shared road policing and firearms teams through a joint Specialist Operations Unit. These officers are based at Cleveland's base at Wynyard Park Business Park and Durham's station in Spennymoor. Durham and Cleveland Police have shared a Tactical Training Centre in Urlay Nook, near Teesside International Airport (formerly Durham Tees Valley Airport), since 2001.

The Cleveland Police area is a major production centre for the chemical industry, which results in the large-scale transport by road, rail and sea of hazardous substances. The chemical industry remains a key economic factor and presents the force, other emergency services and partners with a significant major incident risk.

History
The force was established as Cleveland Constabulary on 1 April 1974, covering the newly created county of Cleveland (which was abolished on 1 April 1996, being replaced with the four unitary authorities). It was renamed Cleveland Police, from Cleveland Constabulary.

It is a successor to the Teesside Constabulary, and also the York and North East Yorkshire Police, which existed before 1974, and also took over part of Durham Constabulary. The police area is the second smallest geographically, after the area covered by the City of London Police.

Under proposals made by the Home Secretary on 6 February 2006, a proposal for a merger with Northumbria Police and Durham Constabulary to form a single strategic police force for the North East England was suggested but there was no support for this. Cleveland Police favoured merging with the southern area of Durham Constabulary. In July 2006, the plans to merge the three forces were scrapped.

2007 – New force headquarters 
On 31 January 2007, the new headquarters in Middlesbrough were opened, boasting a 50-cell custody unit including a purpose-built prevention of terrorism suite, one of only three in the country. It has been designed to increase the speed and safety of detainee handling with secure vehicle docking, video links to court and CCTV links in all cells for improved prisoner safety.

The Middlesbrough headquarters is the centrepiece of Cleveland Police Authority's multi-million pound private finance initiative project which has also seen a new headquarters for Redcar and Cleveland district and new town offices in Redcar and South Bank. The building, which was officially opened by the then Home Secretary John Reid, is seen as not only the spearhead to policing Cleveland in the 21st century but also the gateway to the regeneration of the St Hilda's area of the town and the flagship Middlehaven project.

2008 – Volunteer scheme 
In 2008 Cleveland Police launched its volunteer scheme, by which members of the local community can offer a minimum of 4 hours a week helping the force. As the scheme progresses more roles are expected to become available.

2009 – Cadets scheme 

On 5 January 2009, the force launched its cadets programme, something which many other police forces have operated for some years.  There are 20 places available in each district, and the cadets will meet each week in groups run by police officers, police community support officers, youth workers and volunteers. There will also be the chance to gain recognised qualifications, such as the Duke of Edinburgh Award.

2019 – Findings of HM Inspectorate annual review 
In September 2019, the Cleveland police force was put into special measures after His Majesty's Inspectorate of Constabulary and Fire & Rescue Services (HMICFRS) rated the service as inadequate overall and in three key areas: the extent to which the force is effective at reducing crime and keeping people safe; operates efficiently and sustainably; and treats the public and its workforce legitimately were all found inadequate.  HMICFRS said that the force was "putting the public at risk."  There have been five chief constables since 2012.  Staff described the force as, "directionless, rudderless and clueless".  Vulnerable people including children were not identified and left at risk.  Despite large numbers of domestic abuse victims being repeat victims offenders were not always proactively pursued.  There were delays before police tried to locate youngsters reported missing.  Some victims of honour-based violence and survivors allegedly had had a "terrible experience".  Crime rose 17.6% in the year to 2019 but according to the watchdog, "crime prevention isn't a priority for the force and this is a cause of concern".  The quality of investigations needs improvement, the watchdog maintains.  High-ranking officers and staff were in many cases, "not taking responsibility" and some were "not acting with honesty, integrity and competence".  Cleveland police is in the, "special measures" police equivalent, after a report showing the force failed to prevent crime, protect the public, apprehend criminals or deal with internal corruption.

2020 – Resignation of police and crime commissioner 
A year after the publication of the report, the Cleveland police and crime commissioner (PCC), Barry Coppinger, resigned stating stress and how the workload was "impacting on my health". His resignation was immediate in September 2020 and an interim PCC took over until an election for the post in May 2021.

Chief constables
19741976 : Ralph Davison
19761990 : Christopher Payne 
19901993 : Keith Hellawell 
19932003 : Barry D. Shaw
20032012 : Sean Price, (dismissed for gross misconduct)
20132016 : Jacqui Cheer
20162018 : Iain Spittal
20182019 : Mike Veale
2019 : Lee Freeman (Interim chief constable following Mike Veale's sudden departure)
20192021 : Richard Lewis
20212022 : Helen McMillan (Acting chief constable after Richard Lewis' departure)
20223present : Mark Webster

Officers killed in the line of duty

The Police Roll of Honour Trust and Police Memorial Trust list and commemorate all British police officers killed in the line of duty. Since its establishment in 1984, the Police Memorial Trust has erected 50 memorials nationally to some of those officers.

Since 1893 the following officers of Cleveland Police were killed while attempting to prevent or stop a crime in progress:
 Police Constable William Henderson, 1893 (shot attempting to disarm a man).

Force structure 
Cleveland Police area is divided into four local policing areas (LPAs), previously known as districts, which are coterminous with the four unitary authorities of Hartlepool, Middlesbrough, Redcar and Cleveland and Stockton-on-Tees. These LPAs are split between North and South of the River Tees for operational purposes.

In response to a Freedom of Information Act request in July 2018, Cleveland Police published (in October 2018) the organisational structure of its 'Basic Command Units / Local Policing Units / District Policing Teams or equivalent'.  The chart shows the number of police officers of each rank assigned to each unit.

PEEL assessments 
His Majesty's Inspectorate of Constabulary  (HMICFRS) conducts a periodic police effectiveness, efficiency and legitimacy (PEEL) inspection of each police service's performance. In its latest PEEL inspection, Cleveland was rated as follows:

Alleged or actual offences involving serving officers
In 2007, it was reported that Detective Constable Steve Pennington, who was convicted of a drink driving offence in 2000 and jailed for four months, had been granted a £500,000 pay-off by the force garnering much criticism from members of the public and anti drink driving campaigners.

In April 2012, Cleveland Police admitted liability for "malicious prosecution" and were ordered to pay out over £841,000, one of the largest compensation sums in UK police history. The court was told former PC Sultan Alam was "stitched up" by fellow officers after he launched industrial tribunal proceedings in 1993, complaining of racial discrimination following a series of incidents that included a Ku Klux Klan poster being left on his desk.  Cleveland Police admitted that officers suppressed evidence that lead to Mr Alam being wrongfully imprisoned for conspiracy to steal motor parts and enduring a 17-year battle to clear his name. Mr Alam, who was, as of 2012, considering a position in public office, did not believe that the force had improved and stated that racism had gone "underground", with ethnic minorities being denied the same opportunities as their white colleagues.

In October 2012 the force's chief constable, Sean Price, was sacked after being found guilty of deceit and misconduct. He was dismissed from his £190,000 a year job (one of the highest rates in the country for a chief constable), having been suspended in August 2011 on full pay.

In May 2013, Cleveland Police agreed to pay a settlement of £550,000 to James Watson, a Middlesbrough solicitor who sued them for false imprisonment after being detained for almost 30 hours.

In January 2019, Chief Constable Mike Veale resigned after being referred to the Independent Office for Police Conduct (IOPC) on a matter of "serious allegations" of misconduct.

Force helicopter
Air support is provided by the National Police Air Service (NPAS). Cleveland was previously a member of the North East Air Support Unit helicopter sharing agreement with neighbouring Durham Constabulary and Northumbria Police in which all three forces shared two helicopters, one based at Newcastle Airport and the other at Teesside International Airport.

In 2008, Durham and Northumbria decided that just one helicopter based at Newcastle Airport would be enough. Cleveland disagreed saying that this resource would be based many miles away from Cleveland and would leave it at a disadvantage, and would not agree to the proposal.
As a result, Durham and Northumbria decided to leave the consortium of the three forces, leaving Cleveland to fund its own helicopter costing £500,000.

On 1 April 2009, the former North East Air Support Unit agreement officially ended, and the Cleveland Air Operations Unit was formed.

See also
 List of law enforcement agencies in the United Kingdom, Crown Dependencies and British Overseas Territories
 Law enforcement in the United Kingdom

References

External links

 Cleveland at HMICFRS

Police
Police
Police
Police forces of England
Cleveland, England
1974 establishments in England
Organizations established in 1974